Bonnie Ryan Sloan (born June 1, 1948) is an American former NFL player who was the first of three deaf football players in National Football League history.

Sloan played four games at defensive tackle for the St. Louis Cardinals in the 1973 season.

A native of Lebanon, Tennessee, Sloan starred at Austin Peay State University.  He was a 10th round selection (242nd overall pick) of the 1973 NFL Draft by the Cardinals, who released him after that one season due to a knee injury.

Former Denver Bronco Kenny Walker followed him into the NFL, in the early 1990s; both were then followed by fullback Derrick Coleman, who last played for the Arizona Cardinals.

References
ESPN Pro Football Encyclopedia, 2006 edition

1948 births
Living people
People from Lebanon, Tennessee
Players of American football from Tennessee
American football defensive tackles
Austin Peay State University alumni
St. Louis Cardinals (football) players
Deaf players of American football
American deaf people